The 2022 Northern Ireland Open (officially the 2022 BetVictor Northern Ireland Open) was a professional snooker tournament that took place from 16 to 23 October 2022 at the Waterfront Hall in Belfast, Northern Ireland. Organised by the World Snooker Tour, it was the fourth ranking event of the 2022–23 season, the first tournament in the Home Nations Series, and the third tournament in the BetVictor Series. It was the seventh edition of the Northern Ireland Open since the event was first staged in 2016. The tournament was broadcast on Quest and Eurosport domestically. The winner received £80,000 from a total prize purse of £427,000.

Mark Allen was the defending champion, having defeated John Higgins 9–8 in the final of the previous year's event. He successfully defended his title, winning eight consecutive frames in the final to defeat Zhou Yuelong 9–4. The win gave Allen the seventh ranking title of his career, and qualified him for the following month's Champion of Champions invitational event.

Lu Ning made the tournament's highest break of 141 in his last-64 match against Hammad Miah.

Format 

The Northern Ireland Open was first played in 2016. The 2022 event was the seventh consecutive edition of the tournament. It was the first event in the season's Home Nations Series, the third event in the BetVictor Series, and the fourth world ranking tournament of the 2022–23 snooker season. It was staged from 16 to 23 October 2022 at the Waterfront Hall in Belfast, Northern Ireland. Qualifiers were played from 23 to 28 August 2022 at the Robin Park Leisure Centre in Wigan, England, although qualifiers featuring the top 16 seeds were held over and played at the Waterfront Hall.

The defending champion was Northern Irish player Mark Allen, who had won the previous year's event by defeating Scottish player John Higgins 9–8 in the final. All matches were played as the best of seven frames until the quarter-finals, which were played as the best of nine frames. The semi-finals were the best of 11 and the final best of 17 frames. Betting company BetVictor sponsored the event, which was broadcast on Quest in the United Kingdom; on Eurosport in the United Kingdom, Europe, India, Bangladesh, Bhutan, Maldives, Nepal, Pakistan and Sri Lanka; on Liaoning TV, Superstar online, Migu, Youku and Huya.com in China; on SportsCast in Indonesia; on TAP in the Philippines; on True Sport in Thailand; on Sports Cast in Taiwan; on Astro SuperSport in Malaysia; on DAZN in Canada; and by Matchroom Sport in all other territories.

Prize fund
The event featured a prize fund of £42,000, of which the winner received £80,000. The breakdown of prize money for this event is shown below:
 Winner: £80,000
 Runner-up: £35,000
 Semi-final: £17,500
 Quarter-final: £11,000
 Last 16: £7,500
 Last 32: £4,500
 Last 64: £3,000
 Highest break: £5,000
 Total: £427,000

Summary

Qualification round 

The qualifying round featured 128 players, with most matches played from 23 to 28 August 2022 at the Robin Park Leisure Centre in Wigan. Stephen Hendry withdrew from the qualifiers and was replaced in the draw by Zhao Jianbo. The reigning women's world champion Mink Nutcharut secured her first win on the professional tour as she defeated Mitchell Mann 4–2. The previous season's European Masters champion Fan Zhengyi won his first professional match in six months as he completed a whitewash over Ashley Hugill. Craig Steadman recovered from 2–3 behind to defeat Graeme Dott 4–3, while Northern Ireland's Jordan Brown whitewashed Andrew Pagett. Having recently turned 60, Jimmy White made a 132 break in the deciding frame to defeat Yuan Sijun 4–3 and win his second qualifying match of the season. 

Matches featuring the top-16 seeds were held over and played at the Waterfront Hall on 16 and 17 October. Defending champion Allen made two centuries as he defeated Chang Bingyu 4–1, while the reigning world champion and world number one Ronnie O'Sullivan whitewashed Lukas Kleckers. Three-time champion Judd Trump won four consecutive frames to defeat Rod Lawler 4–1. Shaun Murphy whitewashed Xu Si, while Neil Robertson made breaks of 85, 120, and 55 as he whitewashed Fraser Patrick. Mark Selby defeated Reanne Evans 4–2, while the previous year's runner-up Higgins defeated Fergal O'Brien by the same score, winning two frames on the final black. Three top-16 seeds failed to reach the round of 64: Seventh seed Zhao Xintong lost 1–4 to Lyu Haotian, 16th seed Ricky Walden lost by the same score to Xiao Guodong, and 12th seed Jack Lisowski lost 2–4 to Li Hang, despite making a 127 break in the fourth frame.

Early rounds 

The round of 64 was played from 17 to 19 October. The top two players in the world rankings exited the tournament at this stage. O'Sullivan won the first two frames against world number 49 David Grace, but Grace took the next three with breaks of 57, 94, and 64, helped by a fluke in the fifth frame. O'Sullivan won the sixth frame after Grace missed a black off the spot to tie the scores at 3–3, but Grace made a 51 break in the decider and then clinched the match 4–3 after O'Sullivan went . O'Sullivan commented afterwards that he no longer had "passion and desire" for snooker, and that it had "become like an emotionless-type job". World number two Trump suffered a 1–4 defeat to world number 95 Aaron Hill, who had lost his tour card after the 2022 World Snooker Championship but regained his professional status through Q School. World number 108 David Lilley whitewashed the number 14 seed Stuart Bingham. 

Allen made breaks including 102, 85, and 92 as he whitewashed Chen Zifan in the round of 64. Neil Robertson defeated Fan, Selby defeated Sam Craigie, Mark Williams made a 139 break as he defeated Alexander Ursenbacher, and Brown defeated Thepchaiya Un-Nooh, all by 4–2 scorelines. Sulkowska stated that the cue ball had not hit the yellow, although replays showed the balls making contact. Luca Brecel whitewashed Jimmy White, who received a warning during the fourth frame for "gesticulating" after appearing to stick his finger up at referee Ben Williams. Speaking in commentary, Ronnie O'Sullivan said he believed the warning was "uncalled for". Ding Junhui lost in a deciding frame to Michael White. Jackson Page took a 3–2 lead over Higgins and made a 64 break in the sixth frame, but Higgins responded with a 69 clearance to tie the scores, and then made a 124 break in the decider to win 4–3. Higgins praised Page afterwards, calling him a "great talent". Ninth seed Kyren Wilson also fell 2–3 behind against Sean O’Sullivan but recovered to win the match in a deciding frame.

The round of 32 was played on 19 and 20 October. Sixth seed Higgins lost 1–4 to Robert Milkins, who took a 3–1 lead by winning the fourth frame on a respotted black, before clinching the match with a 63 break in the fifth. Murphy, the 11th seed, lost 2–4 to Zhou Yuelong, while the 15th seed and 2017 runner-up Yan Bingtao lost in a deciding frame to Anthony McGill. Neil Robertson defeated John Astley 4–1, while Li whitewashed Brown, Williams beat Jimmy Robertson 4–2, and Xiao defeated Hossein Vafaei in a decider. Allen lost the first two frames against world number 105 Andy Lee, but won the next three to lead 3–2. Lee tied the scores with a 91 break in frame six, but missed a key pot on the black in the decider, allowing Allen to clinch a 4–3 win. Michael White defeated 13th seed Barry Hawkins 4–2. David Gilbert made two centuries as he defeated Lilley, while Stephen Maguire defeated Kyren Wilson, and Tom Ford defeated Hill, all by 4–1 scorelines.

The round of 16 was played on 20 October. Selby and Michael White were tied at 2–2, but Selby produced a 132 break in the fifth frame and clinched a 4–2 win in the sixth. Williams made a 111 break in the first frame of his match against Maguire, who tied the scores with a 90 clearance in the second. Williams won the third frame, but Maguire produced back-to-back centuries of 123 and 107 to take a 3–2 lead. However, Williams won the last two frames with breaks of 77 and 69 to clinch a 4–3 win. Gilbert also defeated Ford 4–3, making a highest break of 132. Five other matches in the round of 16 ended in 4–0 whitewash victories for Neil Robertson over Li, Allen over Xiao, Zhou over Milkins, McGill over Tian Pengfei, and Lyu over 10th seed Brecel.

Quarter-finals 
The quarter-finals were played on 21 October as the best of nine frames. Facing Selby, Neil Robertson took the first frame with a 73 break, but Selby won the next two, making a 95 break in the third. Robertson made a 97 in the fourth to tie the scores at 2–2 at the mid-session interval. Robertson won the fifth frame with an 84 break, and made a break of 63 in the sixth. Selby had an opportunity to steal the sixth frame with a clearance, but opted to lay a snooker on the final red due to the difficulty of gaining position on the black. However, Robertson escaped from the snooker, won the frame, and made breaks of 73 and 53 in the seventh to clinch a 5–2 victory. It was Robertson's sixth consecutive win over Selby.

Facing Allen, Williams won the first two frames with breaks of 62 and 70. Allen then won four frames in a row to take a 4–2 lead, with Williams scoring just 11 points in those frames. However, Williams won two 30-minute frames to tie the scores at 4–4 and take the match to a deciding frame. Allen led in the decider, but Williams had a chance to steal the frame with a clearance. However, he missed a shot on the black along the top cushion, allowing Allen to win the frame and match. Allen stated afterwards that he was having flashbacks to the 2018 China Open, when Williams had come from 60 points behind to defeat him in a deciding frame, but said he was fortunate to have had the support of his home crowd.

In the other quarter-finals, Zhou faced Gilbert while McGill faced Lyu. Gilbert made breaks of 84, 71, 60, and 55 as he moved into a 4–2 lead. However, he missed several opportunities to close out the match and Zhou made breaks of 63 and 54 to draw level at 4–4. Zhou made a 130 break in the decider to win 5–4 and reach the fifth ranking semi-final of his career. McGill made breaks of 56, 95, 85, and 112 as he established a 4–3 lead. Lyu almost managed to take the match to a decider, as McGill required two snookers in the eighth frame. However, McGill secured the required points from snookers and won the frame for a 5–3 victory.

Semi-finals 

The semi-finals were played on 22 October as the best of 11 frames. Allen faced Neil Robertson and took a 3–1 lead at the mid-session interval, making a 100 break in the fourth frame. After the interval, Allen made a second consecutive century of 136 to move 4–1 ahead. Robertson won the sixth frame with a 68 break, but Allen responded with a 60 break to win the seventh. In the eighth frame, Allen came from behind to clear the colours and force a respotted black. After a lengthy safety duel on the black ball, Allen made a long pot into the yellow pocket to win the match 6–2 and reach his second consecutive Northern Ireland Open final as well as a second consecutive ranking final, having been runner-up to Ryan Day at the 2022 British Open three weeks previously. "It was special winning the last frame the way I did as the atmosphere in those last few shots was phenomenal", Allen stated afterwards. 

In the other semi-final, Zhou faced McGill. The first four frames were shared, with Zhou making a 100 break in the second frame. After the mid-session interval, Zhou made a 132 break to move into a 3–2 lead. However, McGill responded with a 73 break in the sixth after Zhou missed a red, and made a 101 break in the seventh to move 4–3 ahead. Zhou won the eighth frame and snookered McGill at the beginning of the ninth, making a 127 break after McGill left a red available. Trailing 4–5, McGill had the chance to force a decider in the tenth, but missed a shot on the blue. Zhou made a 110 break, clinched a 6–4 victory, and reached the third ranking final of his career. In all, the match featured five century breaks, four from Zhou and one from McGill. "If I win [the tournament], I will be happy to have made my dream come true", said Zhou, but added "It is important to not get under pressure, this is no good. You have to not think about the trophy and just play".

Final 

The final was played on 23 October as the best of 17 frames, held over two sessions, between world number 10 Allen and world number 23 Zhou. In the afternoon session, Allen won the first frame with a 57 break, but Zhou made breaks including 56 and 135 as he won the next four frames. In frame four, Zhou ran out of position and was warned by referee Leo Scullion after he spent more than two minutes considering his options for a safety shot. Jimmy White and Ronnie O'Sullivan criticised the warning in commentary, noting that other players had spent significantly longer over shots without the referee intervening, including a previous incident involving Scullion at the 2019 event, when Selby spent over six minutes on a shot without being warned. From 1–4 behind, Allen made breaks including 68 and 55 as he won the last three frames of the session to tie the scores at 4–4.  

In the evening session, Allen made breaks of 53, 85, 50, and 51 to move 8–4 ahead, before making a 109 clearance to win his eighth consecutive frame and clinch the title with a 9–4 victory. "You know how proud a Northern Irishman I am and how much I want to do well here for the fans. To win two years in a row is something. I just didn't think this day was ever going to happen", Allen commented afterwards. In addition to winning the seventh ranking title of his career, Allen secured the last remaining place at the following month's Champion of Champions invitational event. Zhou's defeat meant that he had lost all three of the ranking finals he had reached, having previously been runner-up at the January 2020 European Masters and the 2020 Snooker Shoot Out.

Main draw 
The results from the event are shown below. Seeded players have their seedings in brackets. Players highlighted in bold denote match winners.

Top half

Bottom half

Final

Qualifying 
Qualification for the tournament took place from 23 to 28 August 2022 at the Robin Park Leisure Centre in Wigan, England. Qualifying matches were played as the best of 7 frames. Players highlighted in bold denote match winners.

Wildcard Round
 0–4

Qualifying

 4–1 
 1–4 
 4–1 
 2–4 
 4–0 
 3–4 
 4–1 
 4–2 
 4–1 
 4–1 
 4–3 
 0–4 
 4–0 
 1–4 
 3–4 
 4–3 
 4–0 
 2–4 
 4–2 
 1–4 
 4–2 
 2–4 
 4–3 
 3–4 
 4–0 
 4–1 
 4–1 
 4–3 
 4–3 
 4–0 
 4–0 
 4–2 
 4–2 
 4–1 
 2–4 
 3–4 
 4–3 
 0–4 
 3–4 
 4–1 
 2–4 
 1–4 
 4–1 
 4–2 
 0–4 
 4–0 
 4–2

Held-over Matches: Round One 
Matches involving the top 16 players — including the defending champion — alongside a wildcard match involving local players, were held over and played at the Waterfront Hall. Zhou Yuelong's match was also held over as he faced the winner of the wildcard match.

  4–1 
  1–4 
  4–0 
  4–2 
  4–0 
  2–4 
  w/o–w/d 
  4–2 

  4–1 
  4–1 
  4–1 
  4–0 
  4–2 
  4–0 
  1–4 
  4–2 
  4–0

Notes

Century breaks

Main stage centuries
During the event 69 century breaks were made.

 141  Lu Ning
 139, 128, 111  Mark Williams
 139  Gerard Greene
 138, 103  Yan Bingtao
 136, 123, 109, 108, 102, 100  Mark Allen
 135, 132, 130, 130, 127, 121, 110, 100  Zhou Yuelong
 135, 120, 114, 107, 102  Neil Robertson
 134, 132, 132, 103  David Gilbert
 134, 123, 104  Lyu Haotian
 133, 132, 113, 112, 105, 101  Anthony McGill
 132  Mark Selby
 128  Jackson Page
 127  Martin Gould
 127  Jack Lisowski
 127  Pang Junxu
 126  Kyren Wilson
 124  John Higgins
 123, 107, 107, 102  Stephen Maguire
 118  Alexander Ursenbacher
 115  David Grace
 114, 109  Judd Trump
 111, 106  Luca Brecel
 111  Sam Craigie
 111  Ding Junhui
 110, 100  Tom Ford
 110  Stuart Bingham
 108  Jimmy Robertson
 106, 100  Barry Hawkins
 102  Fan Zhengyi
 101, 100  Xiao Guodong
 101  Craig Steadman
 100  Ben Woollaston

Qualifying stage centuries

During the qualification round, 15 century breaks were made. The highest was a 138 made by Maguire.

 138  Stephen Maguire
 136  Stuart Carrington
 134  Si Jiahui
 134  Hossein Vafaei
 132  Jimmy White
 125, 104  David Gilbert
 118  Robert Milkins
 115  Dean Young
 112  Jak Jones
 110  Ryan Day
 107  Jackson Page
 102  Craig Steadman
 102  Ben Woollaston
 101  Louis Heathcote

References 

Home Nations Series
2022
Northern Ireland Open
October 2022 sports events in the United Kingdom
Sport in Belfast
Snooker competitions in Northern Ireland
European Series